"Ditty" is a song by American rapper Paperboy from his debut studio album The Nine Yards. It is the opening track on the album and was issued as the album's lead single. The song is primarily based around a sample of Zapp's "Doo Wa Ditty (Blow That Thing)", but it also contains a sample of James Brown's "Funky President (People It's Bad)".

"Ditty" is Paperboy's only song to chart on the Billboard Hot 100, peaking at No. 10 in 1993. It was awarded a platinum certification from the Recording Industry Association of America. In 1994, the song was nominated for a Grammy Award for Best Rap Solo Performance, but lost to "Let Me Ride" by Dr. Dre.

Credits and personnel
Vocals: Mitchell Johnson
Mastered by: Phil Austin
Mixed by: Gary "D.J. GLE" Ellis
Instruments: Dave Cochrane

Track listing
"Ditty" (Explicit) - 4:02
"Ditty" (Edited) - 3:56
"Ditty" (Album Version) - 4:59
"Ditty" (Remix - Explicit) - 5:04
"Ditty" (Remix - Edited) - 5:04
"Ditty" (Radio Mix - feat. Nate Dogg) - 3:51
"Ditty" (DJ Remix) - 4:08

Charts

Weekly charts

Year-end charts

References

External links
 
 

1992 debut singles
Next Plateau Entertainment singles
Paperboy (rapper) songs
Songs written by Roger Troutman
Songs written by Larry Troutman
1992 songs